Fraser Keast (born 13 November 1992) is a Scottish association footballer who plays for Armadale Thistle as a midfielder.

Career

Airdrie
Keast made his first team debut on 11 May 2009 starting against St Johnstone in the Scottish First Division on the final day of the season. His next appearance came against Dunfermline Athletic on 22 August 2009, in what would prove to be his only appearance that season whilst still playing for the under 19's.

During the 2010-11 season Keast made five appearances and was rewarded with a one-year contract extension until May 2012.

Career statistics

References

1992 births
Living people
Scottish footballers
Association football forwards
Airdrieonians F.C. players
Broxburn Athletic F.C. players
Bo'ness United F.C. players
Armadale Thistle F.C. players
Scottish Football League players